David Nath is a British producer and director, best known for his work on television documentaries.

Career 
Nath directed the BBC4 documentary series The Year the Town Hall Shrank (2013), which followed the effects of the economic downturn in Stoke-on-Trent. He was series director of the Channel 4 series Bedlam (2013), which followed patients with mental health problems at South London and Maudsley NHS Foundation Trust. He directed the Channel 4 series The Murder Detectives (2015), about the investigation into the stabbing of Bristol teenager Nicholas Robinson.

Awards 
 Grierson British Documentary awards 2013: Best Documentary Series award for The Year the Town Hall Shrank.
 British Academy Television Awards 2014: Best Factual Series award for Bedlam.
 British Academy Television Awards 2016: Best Factual Director award for The Murder Detectives.

References 

British television producers
British television directors
British documentary filmmakers
Living people
Year of birth missing (living people)